Radio Prnjavor or Радио Прњавор is a Bosnian local public radio station, broadcasting from Prnjavor, Bosnia and Herzegovina.

It was launched on 6 March 1984 by the municipal council of Prnjavor. In Yugoslavia and in SR Bosnia and Herzegovina, it was part of local/municipal Radio Sarajevo network affiliate. This radio station broadcasts a variety of programs such as news, music, morning and talk shows. Program is mainly produced in Serbian language from 07:00 to 19:00.

Estimated number of potential listeners of Radio Prnjavor is around 81,685. Radiostation is also available in municipalities of Zenica-Doboj Canton and in Bosanska Posavina area.

Frequencies
 Prnjavor

See also 
List of radio stations in Bosnia and Herzegovina

References

External links 
 www.fmscan.org
 www.prnjavorlive.info
 www.opstinaprnjavor.net
 Communications Regulatory Agency of Bosnia and Herzegovina

Prnjavor
Radio stations established in 1984